Sprange v Barnard (1789) 2 Bro CC 585 is an English trusts law case, concerning the certainty of subject matter to create a trust. It is an example of a court concluding that the words of a testament being interpreted to mean, in essence, that a gift was intended rather than a trust.

Facts
The testatrix left £300 worth of annuities to her husband ‘for his sole use; and at his death, the remaining part of what is left, that he does not want for his own wants and use to be divided between’ a number of beneficiaries.

Judgment
Sir Richard Arden, Master of the Rolls, held that no trust arose, and the husband took all the property beneficially. Making a gift was the dominant intention, not to bind the husband with a trust.

See also

English trust law

Notes

References

English trusts case law
1789 in British law
Court of Chancery cases